The Charmings is an American fantasy sitcom that follows Snow White and Prince Charming, awakened from a thousand-year spell, as they adjust from their familiar life in the enchanted forest to the modern ways of 20th century Los Angeles suburbs. The series originally aired from March 20, 1987, to February 11, 1988, on ABC.

Synopsis
The opening voice-over sets up the premise:

The premise of the series' plot was that fairy tale characters Snow White and Prince Charming were magically transported to a 20th-century suburb in Burbank, California. Each episode shows the Charmings trying to adapt to their new life while Lillian, the wicked stepmother, and her wise cracking Magic Mirror watch from upstairs. After the first season, Caitlin O'Heaney (who portrayed Snow White) was replaced by Carol Huston.

After mild success as part of ABC's Friday night lineup, the series was moved to Thursday nights for its second season, in a head-to-head battle with NBC's A Different World, and later The Cosby Show. Due to low ratings, the series was canceled after twenty episodes. One episode remains unaired in the US, though it was shown during the show's run in the UK and in 2021 in Canada on CTV.

Characters
 Snow White Charming Played by Caitlin O'Heaney (1987) and Carol Huston (1987–1988). Her "fairy tale" motif catches the attention of a department store executive, who sponsors a line of interior decorating products and gives her a job overseeing the designs.
 Prince Eric Charming Played by Christopher Rich. Unskilled at anything in the modern world, he largely is a stay-at-home dad who wrote about his time in the Enchanted Kingdom. Later he learns he has a skill for handyman work and carpentry, and soon gets a job in construction.
 Thomas and Cory Charming The two Charming children of Snow White and Prince Eric Charming. Played by Brandon Call and Garette Ratliff Henson. Due to their spending the least time in the fairy tale world, they had been the most assimilated into 20th century society, and they face difficulties accepting they are from fairy tales.
 Queen Lillian White The wicked stepmother of Snow White, whose sorcery often backfires on her, but occasionally proves useful in helping her family. Played by Judy Parfitt.
 Luther One of the Seven Dwarfs. Played by Cork Hubbert. 
 The Magic Mirror Played by Paul Winfield. The Mirror frequently reminds Lillian that her daughter and son-in-law will come out on top and make it in this new land because unlike her, they are goodhearted people who respected others. A running gag is that he makes remarks about how Snow White is the fairest and telling Lillian "it ain't you!" whenever she asks who is the fairest. However, it is implied he may have been joking, because at one point when Lillian has lost her powers and he must depart, he confides in her that she has always been the fairest.
 Don "King of Carpets" Miller and Sally Miller The Charmings' neighbors who find their new neighbors' penchant for medieval fairy tale style odd but never figure out they were the real Prince Charming and Snow White. Even when Eric is under a truth spell and confides in Don that they were Prince Charming and Snow White, Don considers it a joke. Played by Paul Eiding and Dori Brenner.

Episodes

Season 1 (1987)

Season 2 (1987–88)

Awards and nominations

References

External links
 
 

1987 American television series debuts
1988 American television series endings
1980s American sitcoms
American Broadcasting Company original programming
English-language television shows
American fantasy television series
Fantasy comedy television series
Works based on Snow White
Television shows set in Burbank, California
Television series by Sony Pictures Television
Television shows based on fairy tales